|}

The Hatton's Grace Hurdle is a Grade 1 National Hunt hurdle race in Ireland which is open to horses aged four years or older. It is run at Fairyhouse over a distance of about 2 miles and 4 furlongs (4,023 metres), and during its running there are twelve hurdles to be jumped. The race is scheduled to take place each year in late November or early December.

The event is named after Hatton's Grace, a three-time winner of the Champion Hurdle trained by Vincent O'Brien. It was established in 1994, and it has held Grade 1 status throughout its history. It is usually staged on the same afternoon as two other top-grade races – the Royal Bond Novice Hurdle and the Drinmore Novice Chase.

Records
Most successful horse (3 wins):
 Limestone Lad – 1999, 2001, 2002
 Solerina – 2003, 2004, 2005
 Apple's Jade - 2016, 2017, 2018
 Honeysuckle - 2019, 2020, 2021 

Leading jockey (3 wins):
 Charlie Swan – Danoli (1994), Istabraq (1997, 1998)
 Gary Hutchinson – Solerina (2003, 2004, 2005)
 Rachael Blackmore - Honeysuckle (2019, 2020, 2021)

Leading trainer (6 wins):
 James Bowe – Limestone Lad (1999, 2001, 2002), Solerina (2003, 2004, 2005)

Winners

See also
 Horse racing in Ireland
 List of Irish National Hunt races

References
 Racing Post:
 pedigreequery.com – Hatton's Grace Hurdle – Fairyhouse.

National Hunt races in Ireland
National Hunt hurdle races
Recurring sporting events established in 1994
Fairyhouse Racecourse
1994 establishments in Ireland